Iridomyrmex hesperus is a species of ant in the genus Iridomyrmex. Described by Shattuck in 1993, not much is known about the ant, other than its populations are mostly confined in Western Australia.

References

Iridomyrmex
Hymenoptera of Australia
Insects described in 1993